Pierre Claver Mella (born 20 July 1962) is a Cameroonian boxer. He competed in the men's light middleweight event at the 1984 Summer Olympics.

References

1962 births
Living people
Cameroonian male boxers
Olympic boxers of Cameroon
Boxers at the 1984 Summer Olympics
Place of birth missing (living people)
Light-middleweight boxers
20th-century Cameroonian people